Venatrix is a genus of wolf spiders first described by Carl Friedrich Roewer in 1960.

Species
, it contains 27 species, all from Australia, with outliers in the Philippines and New Caledonia:

Venatrix allopictiventris Framenau & Vink, 2001
Venatrix amnicola Framenau, 2006
Venatrix archookoora Framenau & Vink, 2001
Venatrix arenaris (Hogg, 1906)
Venatrix australiensis Framenau & Vink, 2001
Venatrix brisbanae (L. Koch, 1878)
Venatrix esposica Framenau & Vink, 2001
Venatrix fontis Framenau & Vink, 2001
Venatrix funesta (C. L. Koch, 1847)
Venatrix furcillata (L. Koch, 1867)
Venatrix hickmani Framenau & Vink, 2001
Venatrix konei (Berland, 1924)
Venatrix koori Framenau & Vink, 2001
Venatrix kosciuskoensis (McKay, 1974)
Venatrix lapidosa (McKay, 1974)
Venatrix magkasalubonga (Barrion & Litsinger, 1995)
Venatrix mckayi Framenau & Vink, 2001
Venatrix ornatula (L. Koch, 1877)
Venatrix palau Framenau, 2006
Venatrix penola Framenau & Vink, 2001
Venatrix pictiventris (L. Koch, 1877)
Venatrix pseudospeciosa Framenau & Vink, 2001
Venatrix pullastra (Simon, 1909)
Venatrix roo Framenau & Vink, 2001
Venatrix speciosa (L. Koch, 1877)
Venatrix summa (McKay, 1974)
Venatrix tinfos Framenau, 2006

References

Lycosidae
Araneomorphae genera
Spiders of Australia
Spiders of Asia
Spiders of Oceania
Taxa named by Carl Friedrich Roewer